Polo Peak is a summit in South Dakota, in the United States.

Polo Peak was named for the fact polo was played at its base.

References

Landforms of Lawrence County, South Dakota
Mountains of South Dakota